Didemnum is a genus of colonial tunicates in the family Didemnidae. It is the most speciose genus in the didemnid family. Species in this genus often have small calcareous spicules embedded in the tunic and form irregular or lobed colonies. Some Didemnum species, including Didemnum vexillum and Didemnum perlucidem are considered invasive species. In early 2006, Didemnum vexillum was found covering a 230 km2 area of cobble habitat in Georges Bank off the coast of New England, and is classified as an invasive species of greatest concern in coastal areas throughout Europe, New Zealand, and North America. Didemnum sp. invasions have also been recorded in Canada, the Mediterranean, and the Netherlands.

Species in this genus can be found in tropical or temperate regions. Some tropical species such as Didemnum molle have photosynthetic algae in their tunics.

Species
The following species are recognised in the genus Didemnum:
 
Didemnum abradatum 
Didemnum ahu 
Didemnum albidum 
Didemnum albopunctatum 
Didemnum algasedens 
Didemnum amethysteum 
Didemnum amourouxi 
Didemnum apersum 
Didemnum apuroto 
Didemnum arancium 
Didemnum aratore 
Didemnum asterix 
Didemnum astrum 
Didemnum augusti 
Didemnum aurantiacum 
Didemnum aurantium 
Didemnum aures 
Didemnum bentarti 
Didemnum beringense 
Didemnum biglans 
Didemnum biglutinum 
Didemnum bimasculum 
Didemnum bisectatum 
Didemnum brevioris 
Didemnum caesium 
Didemnum calliginosum 
Didemnum candidum 
Didemnum captivum 
Didemnum carnulentum 
Didemnum carpenteri 
Didemnum caudiculatum 
Didemnum cerebrale 
Didemnum chartaceum 
Didemnum chilense 
Didemnum cilicium 
Didemnum cineraceum 
Didemnum clavum 
Didemnum coccineum 
Didemnum commune 
Didemnum complexum 
Didemnum conchyliatum 
Didemnum congregatum 
Didemnum contortum 
Didemnum coralliforme 
Didemnum coriaceum 
Didemnum corium 
Didemnum crescente 
Didemnum cuculliferum 
Didemnum cygnuus 
Didemnum dealbatum 
Didemnum delectum 
Didemnum densum 
Didemnum dicolla 
Didemnum diffundum 
Didemnum digestum 
Didemnum diversum 
Didemnum dolium 
Didemnum domesticum 
Didemnum drachi 
Didemnum duplicatum 
Didemnum ectensum 
Didemnum edmondsoni 
Didemnum edwardsi 
Didemnum effusium 
Didemnum elikapekae 
Didemnum elongatum 
Didemnum epikelp 
Didemnum etiolum 
Didemnum extensum 
Didemnum fibriae 
Didemnum filiforme 
Didemnum flagellatum 
Didemnum flammacolor 
Didemnum flavoviride 
Didemnum fragile 
Didemnum fragum 
Didemnum fucatum 
Didemnum fulgens 
Didemnum fuscum 
Didemnum galacteum 
Didemnum gayanae 
Didemnum gemmiparum 
Didemnum gigas 
Didemnum gintonicum 
Didemnum globiferum 
Didemnum grande 
Didemnum granulatum 
Didemnum granulosum 
Didemnum guttatum 
Didemnum halimedae 
Didemnum helgolandicum 
Didemnum herba 
Didemnum hiopaa 
Didemnum immundum 
Didemnum inaequilobatum 
Didemnum inauratum 
Didemnum incanum 
Didemnum inveteratum 
Didemnum japonicum 
Didemnum jedanense 
Didemnum jeffreysi 
Didemnum jucundum 
Didemnum karlae 
Didemnum kelleri 
Didemnum kurilense 
Didemnum lacertosum 
Didemnum lacustre 
Didemnum lahillei 
Didemnum lambertae 
Didemnum lambitum 
Didemnum leopardi 
Didemnum leopardum 
Didemnum levitas 
Didemnum ligulum 
Didemnum lillipution 
Didemnum linatum 
Didemnum linguiferum 
Didemnum lissoclinum 
Didemnum lithostrotum 
Didemnum longigaster 
Didemnum lutarium 
Didemnum macrosiphonium 
Didemnum macrospiculatum 
Didemnum maculatum 
Didemnum maculosum 
Didemnum madagascariense 
Didemnum madeleinae 
Didemnum magnetae 
Didemnum mantile 
Didemnum megaductus 
Didemnum megasterix 
Didemnum mekeald 
Didemnum membranaceum 
Didemnum mesembrinum 
Didemnum microthoracicum 
Didemnum millari 
Didemnum minisculum 
Didemnum minispirale 
Didemnum misakiense 
Didemnum molle 
Didemnum monile 
Didemnum montosum 
Didemnum moseleyi 
Didemnum multiampullae 
Didemnum multispirale 
Didemnum mutabile 
Didemnum nambucciensis 
Didemnum neglectum 
Didemnum nekozita 
Didemnum nigricans 
Didemnum nigrum 
Didemnum nivale 
Didemnum nocturnum 
Didemnum oblitum 
Didemnum obscurum 
Didemnum ossium 
Didemnum paa 
Didemnum pacificum 
Didemnum papillatum 
Didemnum parancium 
Didemnum parau 
Didemnum pardum 
Didemnum partitum 
Didemnum parvum 
Didemnum patulum 
Didemnum pecten 
Didemnum pellucidum 
Didemnum perlucidum 
Didemnum perplexum 
Didemnum perspicuum 
Didemnum peyrefittense 
Didemnum pica 
Didemnum pitipiri 
Didemnum plebeium 
Didemnum poecilomorpha 
Didemnum polare 
Didemnum precocinum 
Didemnum protectum 
Didemnum psammatodes 
Didemnum pseudobiglans 
Didemnum pseudofulgens 
Didemnum pseudovexillum 
Didemnum quincunciale 
Didemnum recurvatum 
Didemnum risirense 
Didemnum roberti 
Didemnum rochai 
Didemnum rodriguesi 
Didemnum romssae 
Didemnum roseum 
Didemnum rota 
Didemnum rottnesti 
Didemnum rubeum 
Didemnum sachalinense 
Didemnum sanakiensis 
Didemnum santaelenae 
Didemnum scopi 
Didemnum semifuscum 
Didemnum siphonale 
Didemnum sordidum 
Didemnum spadix 
Didemnum speciosum 
Didemnum sphaericum 
Didemnum spongioides 
Didemnum spumante 
Didemnum spumosum 
Didemnum stercoratum 
Didemnum stilense 
Didemnum stragulum 
Didemnum studeri 
Didemnum subflavum 
Didemnum subtile 
Didemnum sucosum 
Didemnum tabulatum 
Didemnum tantulum 
Didemnum tapetum 
Didemnum tenue 
Didemnum ternerratum 
Didemnum tetrahedrum 
Didemnum theca 
Didemnum thomsoni 
Didemnum tigrinoides 
Didemnum toafene 
Didemnum tonga 
Didemnum torresii 
Didemnum tortile 
Didemnum translucidum 
Didemnum transparentum 
Didemnum trispirale 
Didemnum tuberatum 
Didemnum tumulatum 
Didemnum usitatum 
Didemnum uturoa 
Didemnum vahatuio 
Didemnum valgum 
Didemnum vanderhorsti 
Didemnum velans 
Didemnum velum 
Didemnum verdantum 
Didemnum vermiforme 
Didemnum vesica 
Didemnum vesperi 
Didemnum vexillum 
Didemnum via 
Didemnum viride 
Didemnum vulgare 
Didemnum yolky

References

 (USGS) National Geologic Studies of Benthic Habitats, Northeastern United States has a Marine Nuisance Species page dedicated to this genus

Enterogona
Tunicate genera
Taxa named by Marie Jules César Savigny